All Out or All out may relate to:

Music
 All Out (album), a 1973 album by Grin
 All Out (EP), a 2020 EP from K-pop group K/DA
 "All Out Life", a 2018 Slipknot song
 "All Out of Love", a 1980 Air Supply song
 All Out of Love (musical), a 2018 musical based on songs by Air Supply
 "All Out of Love" (H & Claire song), a 2002 song by H & Claire
 "All Out of Luck", a 1999 song by Selma Björnsdóttir

Other uses
 All Out (organisation), a global not-for-profit organisation that is focused on political advocacy for the human rights of LGBT people
 AEW All Out, an annual professional wrestling event by All Elite Wrestling (AEW)
 All Out of Love (TV series), a 2018 Chinese television series
 All Out!!, a Japanese manga series published from 2012 to 2019
 All Out Cricket, a cricket magazine published from 2002 to 2017
 All out (cricket), when all but one batsman has been dismissed, resulting in the end of the innings
 All Out Motorsports, an American stock car racing team

See also
 All Out War (disambiguation)